C. E. Murphy (born June 1, 1973) is an American-born author, based in Ireland, who writes in the fantasy and romance genres. She is the author of the Walker Papers series, The Negotiator Trilogy, and the Inheritor's Cycle as well as The Strongbox Chronicles (written under a pseudonym). She has also written the graphic novel Take a Chance.

Biography
C. E. Murphy is an Alaskan-born writer of fantasy novels, short stories and comic books. She has also written a romance novel trilogy under the pseudonym Cate Dermody, which was her grandmother's maiden name.

She became an Irish citizen by grandparental descent in 2001, moved to Ireland in 2005, and as of 2020, continued to live there with her husband and son.

Along with writing, she has worked at various points as a library volunteer, archival assistant, cannery worker, and web designer. However writing is her primary hobby.

Bibliography 
As of 2021, the author's works, grouped by series, include:

The Walker Papers 
Urban Shaman (2005)
Magic Hath an Element (first part of Urban Shaman from an alternate viewpoint)
Banshee Cries in the Winter Moon anthology (2009) with Mercedes Lackey and Tanith Lee
Thunderbird Falls (2006)
Coyote Dreams (2007)
Rabbit Tricks (2009, online)
Walking Dead (2009)
Demon Hunts (2010)
Spirit Dances (2011)
Forgotten But By a Few (short story)
Easy Pickings (December 2011) (novella, co-author with Faith Hunter)
Raven Calls (2012)
No Dominion (April 2012) (novella) 
Mountain Echoes (January 2013)
Shaman Rises (July 2014, final book in the series)
Spite House (July 26, 2016) (short story, co-author with Kat Richardson)
Rabbit Tricks (short story)
Five Card Draw (2013) (short story)

The Old Races Universe

The Negotiator Trilogy
 Heart of Stone (2007)
 House of Cards (2008)
 Hands of Flame (2008)

Other books
 The Old Races: Origins (2012, short story collection), background for this universe
 Year of Miracles (2010, collection, some prequels to the trilogy including Year of Miracles (novella, also published separately))
 Baba Yaga's Daughter & Other Tales of the Old Races (2012, collection), stories set before and after the trilogy
 The Old Races: Aftermath (2012, collection), pieces set after the trilogy
 Kiss of Angels (collection), pieces set after the trilogy

Short pieces
 Hot Time in the Old Town Tonight (novella)
 From Russia, With Love in the Fantasy Medley anthology (2009) with Kelley Armstrong, Kate Elliott, Robin Hobb, and Yanni Kuznia
 Perchance to Dream in the Dragon's Lure anthology (2010) with Danielle Ackley-McPhail

The Worldwalker DuologyTruthseeker (2010)Wayfinder (2011)

The Austen ChroniclesMagic & Manners A retelling of Pride and Prejudice in a fantasy setting; "It is a truth universally accepted that well-bred members of Society are not beleaguered with magic," but every one of Mrs. Dover's five daughters has a magic talent, some stronger than others

The Inheritors' CycleThe Queen's Bastard (2008)The Pretender's Crown (2009)

The Strongbox Chronicles written as Cate DermodyThe Cardinal Rule (2005)The Firebird Deception (2006)The Phoenix Law (2006)

The Guildmaster Saga
Young adult seriesSeamasterStonemasterThe Dublin Driver Mysteries
A detective fiction seriesDead in DublinDeath on the GreenDeath of an Irish MummyThe Heartstrike Chronicles
"Atlantis Fallen" (2016)

The Lovelorn ChroniclesBewitching BenedictOther works
NovelsComing to AmericaStone's ThroeRoses in AmberShort StoriesCairn Dancer in The Phantom Queen Awakes anthology (2010) with Anya Bast, Elaine Cunningham, and Katharine KerrBlended in the Running with the Pack anthology (2010) with Laura Anne Gilman and Carrie VaughnThem ShoesComicsTake a Chance (2009) a 5 issue comic series for Dabel Brothers with Ardian Syaf (as the artist)., with an Issue #0, Previously on Take a Chance'' added

References

External links
 Official website (author listing at )
 Book covers and reviews at Fantasy Literature.net
Magical Words – Writing blog of Faith Hunter, C.E. Murphy, David B. Coe, and Misty Massey

1973 births
People from Kenai, Alaska
Writers from Alaska
Women science fiction and fantasy writers
Urban fantasy writers
American fantasy writers
American women short story writers
American women novelists
American romantic fiction writers
21st-century American novelists
21st-century American women writers
21st-century American short story writers
Writers from Dublin (city)
Irish women novelists
Irish fantasy writers
Living people